Paul Shiels is a hurler from County Antrim, Northern Ireland, who plays as a midfielder for the Antrim senior team.

Shiels made his first appearance for the team during the 2007 National League and immediately became a regular member of the starting fifteen. Since then he has won four Ulster winners' medal.

At club level Shiels is a two-time Ulster medalist with Dunloy. In addition to this he has also won two county club championship winners' medals.

References

Year of birth missing (living people)
Living people
Dunloy hurlers
Antrim inter-county hurlers
Ulster inter-provincial hurlers